Russell Guy Sullivan (February 19, 1923 – November 2, 2013) was an outfielder in Major League Baseball who played from 1951 to 1953 for the Detroit Tigers.

External links
Baseball Almanac
Baseball Reference – MLB statistics
Baseball Reference – MiLB statistics
Obituary
Retrosheet

1923 births
2013 deaths
Baseball players from Virginia
Buffalo Bisons (minor league) players
Columbus Jets players
Danville Leafs players
Detroit Tigers players
Little Rock Travelers players
Major League Baseball outfielders
Sportspeople from Fredericksburg, Virginia
Portland Beavers players
Toledo Mud Hens players
Williamsport Grays players
Williamsport Tigers players